Xenidae is a family of twisted-winged insects in the order Strepsiptera. There are about 13 genera and more than 120 described species in Xenidae.

Genera
These 13 genera belong to the family Xenidae:

 Brasixenos Kogan & Oliveira, 1966
 Deltoxenos Benda et al, 2022
 Eupathocera Pierce, 1908
 Leionotoxenos Pierce, 1909
 Macroxenos Schultze, 1925
 Nipponoxenos (Kifune & Maeta, 1975)
 Paragioxenos Ogloblin, 1923
 Paraxenos Saunders, 1872
 Pseudoxenos Saunders, 1872
 Sphecixenos Benda et al, 2022
 Tachytixenos Pierce, 1911
 Tuberoxenos Benda et al, 2022
 Xenos Rossi, 1793

References

Strepsiptera